Maziah Mahusin (born 18 March 1993) is a Bruneian hurdler, whom participated in the 2010 Summer Youth Olympics and 2012 London Olympics, and became Brunei's first female Olympian. She also was selected as the country's flag-bearer for both of the event. Maziah is became the face of female athletics in Brunei.

Early life 
She attends Micronet College has postponed her studies as a result and was not a full-time student; she would continue them in September 2012, following the Olympics. She was a national hockey player before this.

Career 
It began at her Track and Field Sports Day competition in 2007. She competed in an 800-meter race and won it. The national athletic team was present; after observing me run, one of them approached and invited her to join their squad. She spent three months working out with the national squad before making her debut for Brunei in the Teluk Danga Games in Johor. Despite finishing second, she managed to speed up. She then began to consider this carefully. She continued to triumph in several regional and international contests and was recognized as the nation's best female athlete in 2009 and 2011.

Mahusin competed in the 400-meter hurdles up till the Youth Olympics in 2010. She severely damaged the tendon in her right ankle during preparation for the tournament, where it never recovered. Over a year has gone since the Olympics, yet it is still unknown whether Mahusin's performance in London had any lasting impression on Bruneian women's athletics. Mahusin came in second last overall with a time of 59.28 seconds, behind the winner Williams-Mills by nine seconds. She had broken the Bruneian national record, established a new personal best, and achieved an Olympic first. 

She successful received a surgery to remove calcaneal spurs from her right heel on 5 July 2017. Despite using crutches and wearing a cast, then 24-year-old returned to the gym in only a fortnight. Later on 27 July, Maziah began core training. On 30 August, she began her rehabilitation and cycling program.

After bagging one gold and one silver medal during the 66th Sarawak Open Athletics Championships, she emerged as the greatest victor. She finished first in the women's 100-meter race in 13.21 seconds, 0.15 seconds faster than Nurfatieah Abdullah of Labuan. After winning her semi-final match at the Sarawak Stadium in 13.10 seconds, Maziah advanced to the final. But in their second encounter, Nurfatieah triumphed by winning the women's 200m gold. Both Maziah and Nurfatieah had identical times of 27.18 seconds. Maziah had had a time of 27.82s to win her semi-final.

Achievements

References

External links 
 Profile at worldathletics.org

1993 births
Living people
Bruneian female sprinters
Bruneian female hurdlers
Olympic athletes of Brunei
Athletes (track and field) at the 2012 Summer Olympics
Athletes (track and field) at the 2010 Summer Youth Olympics